Jacob M. Lashly (ca. 1882 – 1967) was a president of the American Bar Association.

In 1953 Lashly was nominated by the United States to the United Nations Administrative Tribunal.

In 1954 he was a member of a Pittsburgh, Pennsylvania, committee that opposed the Bricker Amendment, which President Dwight D. Eisenhower said would curb his powers in dealing with foreign affairs.

In 1956 he was a board member of the Metropolitan Church Federation of St. Louis, Missouri.

He retired in 1965 after eighty years as a lawyer and died October 2, 1967.

References

1967 deaths
American lawyers
Year of birth uncertain